Bigmama Didn't Shop At Woolworth's (Texas A&M University Press 1996)  is a memoir by Sunny Nash about life with her part-Comanche grandmother during the Civil Rights Movement. Bigmama Didn't Shop At Woolworth's was chosen as an Association of American University Presses Book for Understanding U.S. Race Relations. The book was also recommended by the Miami-Dade Public Library System for Native American Collections.

Nash's book, still in print and collected worldwide, consists of a collection of articles from Nash's newspaper column contributions to the Houston Chronicle (Texas Magazine, State Lines Column). Tony Pederson, then Chronicle executive editor and later Endowed Chair of Journalism at Southern Methodist University in Dallas, gave Nash her first Chronicle assignment. This assignment, "A Mission Completed For Doll," earned Nash regular publication in the State Lines column, edited by Ken Hammond, and publication in Hammond's collection, State Lines, illustrated by Rolf Laub, with a foreword by Leon Hale. Nash's "A Mission Completed For Doll" was later published in Nash's book, Bigmama Didn't Shop At Woolworth's.

“Indeed, Bigmama had a stoic bearing which combined with a wry sense of humor to produce a genre of cryptic, often cautionary witticisms all her own. Bigmama delivered one of these gems, for instance, in response to young Nash's materialistic yearnings before Christmas one year,” Elizabeth Lasch-Quinn, book review in The Mississippi Quarterly(Vol. 51, Issue 4), published by Johns Hopkins University Press.

In 1996, Texas First Lady, Laura Bush, invited Nash to read from Bigmama Didn't Shop At Woolworth's at the Inaugural Texas Book Festival. In 1997, Nash's book was included in The Writers Harvest: The National Reading to Benefit Hunger and Poverty. Melody Graulich based her paper, "The Spaces of Segregation," on Nash's book, Bigmama Didn't Shop At Woolworth's. Graulich presented her paper the American Studies Association Annual Meeting.

Reception
The Library Journal recommended Bigmama for black studies or Texas history collections, writing, "Nash tells a story of the wrongs of racial prejudice..." and the School Library Journal wrote, "Young people will learn a lot from this book."

Glencoe literature: the reader's choice explained, "Edgar Gabriel Silex and Sunny Nash honor grandparents whose dignity inspired them..."

It has also been reviewed by Publishers Weekly, the Mississippi Quarterly, The Western Journal of Black Studies, and the Los Angeles Times.

References 

1996 non-fiction books
Books about Texas
Books about African-American history
American memoirs